The 1956 season was FC Steaua București's 9th season since its founding in 1947.

Friendly matches

Divizia A

League table

Results

Source:

Cupa României

Results

See also

 1956 Cupa României
 1956 Divizia A

Notes and references

External links
 1956 FC Steaua București Divizia A matches
 How romanian football looked in 1956
 CCA and its tour in England
 Steaua's first team to conquest the west
 50 years ago...

FC Steaua București seasons
1955–56 in Romanian football
1956–57 in Romanian football
Steaua, București
Steaua, București
Steaua
Steaua
Romanian football championship-winning seasons